Pan frying or pan-frying is a form of frying food characterized by the use of minimal cooking oil or fat (compared to shallow frying or deep frying), typically using just enough to lubricate the pan. In the case of a greasy food such as bacon, no oil or fats may need to be added. As a form of frying, the technique relies on oil or fat as the heat transfer medium, and on correct temperature and time to not overcook or burn the food. Pan frying can serve to retain the moisture in foods such as meat and seafood. The food is typically flipped at least once to ensure that both sides are cooked properly.

Specifics 
Pan frying takes place at lower heat than sautéing. This is because the food to be pan fried – such as chicken breasts, steak, pork chops, or fish fillets – is not cut into small pieces before cooking. It requires a lower heat so that the exterior of the food does not overcook by the time the interior reaches the proper temperature, and to keep foods in a moister state. However, the oil should always be hot enough to ensure that the moisture in the food can escape in the form of steam; the force of the steam escaping keeps the oil from soaking into the food. The same amount of oil is used as for sautéing – just enough to glaze the pan.

Equipment

Generally, a shallower cooking vessel is used for pan frying than for deep frying; however, using a deep pan with a small amount of oil, butter or bacon grease does reduce spatter. A denser cooking vessel is better than a less dense pan because the added mass will improve temperature regulation. An electric skillet can be used analogously to an electric deep fryer, and many of these devices have a thermostat to keep the liquid (in this case, oil) at the desired temperature.

Breading 
Foods to be pan fried are sometimes covered with a batter or breading. Batters consist of dried ingredients such as flour or cornstarch in conjunction with liquids such as milk, water or other beverages. Breading can be as simple as dusting the food in flour or, more commonly, what is called the "standard breading procedure", which involves first dusting the food in flour (taking care to shake off the excess), then dipping it in beaten eggs, and finally putting it into bread crumbs (or some other form of outer coating). The food is seasoned with salt and pepper prior to applying any coating. Allowing the food to rest for 15–30 minutes before frying but after applying the breading enables the coating to stick to the food with greater tenacity.

See also

 Frying
 Deep frying
 Shallow frying
 Frying pan
 Sautéing

References

External links
 

Cooking techniques
Culinary terminology
Fried foods